Lester Wayne (Les) Lancaster (born April 21, 1962) is a former professional baseball player who pitched in the Major Leagues from 1987–1993 and later managed in the minor leagues.

Along with fellow reliever Mitch Williams, Lancaster helped lead the Chicago Cubs to a surprise 1989 National League East division title.

Lancaster played college baseball for the Arkansas Razorbacks and Dallas Baptist University.

In 703.2 innings of work, Lancaster was 41-28, a winning percentage of .594 with an ERA of 4.05. He was a good fielding pitcher, committing only one error in 139 total chances for a .993 fielding percentage.

External links

1962 births
Adirondack Lumberjacks players
American expatriate baseball players in Mexico
Arkansas Razorbacks baseball players
Baseball players from Dallas
Buffalo Bisons (minor league) players
Chicago Cubs players
Dallas Baptist Patriots baseball players
Detroit Tigers players
Grays Harbor Gulls players
Guerreros de Oaxaca players
Iowa Cubs players
Lincoln Saltdogs players
Living people
Major League Baseball pitchers
Mexican League baseball pitchers
Minor league baseball managers
Pine Bluff Locomotives players
Pittsfield Cubs players
St. Louis Cardinals players
Syracuse Chiefs players
Tupelo (minor league baseball) players
Winston-Salem Spirits players
Wytheville Cubs players